Jerrad Robert Tyson is an Australian professional goalkeeper who plays for Queensland club Sunshine Coast FC.

Club career

Gold Coast United
On 1 December 2010 he made his debut for Gold Coast United against North Queensland Fury. In May 2012 trialled at Sydney FC.

Western Sydney Wanderers
On 2 August 2012, it was confirmed he had signed with Western Sydney Wanderers. After a season and a half being the back-up goalkeeper, Tyson made his debut against Perth Glory following a groin injury to first goalkeeper Ante Čović and kept a clean sheet.

Perth Glory
On 24 June 2015, Tyson signed with Perth Glory on a two-year contract. On 18 May 2016, Tyson and Perth Glory mutually terminated his contract after he only made two appearances for the club, both of them in the FFA Cup.

Return to Western Sydney Wanderers
A day after leaving Perth Glory, Tyson re-joined Western Sydney Wanderers.
 On 12 April 2018, Tyson was released from the Wanderers by mutual consent to pursue further opportunities.

After a short stint with South Melbourne FC in the NPL Victoria, Tyson joined Indian club Chennai City FC on 8 June 2018. However, Tyson left Chennai in November 2018 following a dispute with the club.

Career statistics

CS = Clean Sheets

1 - includes A-League final series statistics
2 - AFC Champions League statistics are included in season commencing during group stages (i.e. ACL 2014 and A-League season 2013–14 etc.)

Honours
With Australia:
 Weifang Cup (U-18): 2007
With Gold Coast United:
National Youth League Championship: 2009–10

References

External links
 Western Sydney Wanderers profile

1989 births
Australian soccer players
Australian Institute of Sport soccer players
Perth Glory FC players
Western Sydney Wanderers FC players
Gold Coast United FC players
TSW Pegasus FC players
Chennai City FC players
Brisbane Strikers FC players
Green Gully SC players
Melbourne Victory FC players
A-League Men players
Hong Kong First Division League players
Australian expatriate soccer players
Expatriate footballers in Hong Kong
Sportsmen from Tasmania
Soccer players from Tasmania
Living people
Expatriate footballers in India
Australian expatriate sportspeople in India
Association football goalkeepers